FETV (abbreviation for Family Entertainment Television and stylized as fetv) is an American cable and satellite television network owned by the Family Broadcasting Corporation. Marketed as "satellite and cable network featuring classic and inspirational programming the whole family can enjoy", the network airs a variety of classic television programs from the 1950s through the 1980s, along with religious and televangelism programming. The service is available to over 50 million subscribers via cable, satellite and streaming platforms.

Programming
FETV consists of classic TV programs with a wide variety of genres including sitcoms, westerns and mystery series. Marathons are periodically shown at various times of the year.

References

External links

Television networks in the United States
Classic television networks
Nostalgia television in the United States
Television channels and stations established in 2013
2013 establishments in the United States
Family Broadcasting Corporation